Underworld London: Crime and Punishment in the Capital City is a 2012 book by British author, academic and journalist, Catharine Arnold. The book is a "colourful, gruesome" history of crime and punishment in London. The book also examines the influence of the "criminal classes in on literature" and examines the Soho gangs of the 1950s and 1960s.

Reception
In The Daily Telegraph Lilian Pizzichini described the book as "a chronological account of theft, murder and riot, and the concurrent methods of restraining the population in the capital" and noted that "Arnold clearly favours the highwayman: her pen-portraits sparkle with the notoriety and swagger of these romantic figures." The Historical Novel Society also praised the work, writing "the author collates a variety of secondary sources in a readable and pacy narrative" and whilst also noting "Arnold makes a strong case to show why capital punishment should remain off the statute books and if there is anything positive to take away from this catalogue of human iniquity, it is that the more enlightened recent attitudes towards the punishment of serious crime has to be a good thing".

References

2012 non-fiction books
History books about London
Books about London
Non-fiction crime books
Non-fiction books about gangs
History books about crime
History books about punishment
Books by Catharine Arnold
Simon & Schuster books